The 1945 Harvard Crimson football team was an American football team that represented Harvard University during the 1945 college football season. Head coach Dick Harlow returned for his ninth year, after a two-year gap while serving in the Navy. The team compiled a 5–3 record and outscored its opponents 161 to 80. Robert Cowen II was the team captain.

During Harlow's absence, Harvard played a shortened "informal" schedule in 1943 and 1944, lacking its traditional Ivy League opponents. Harlow's return from military service, as well as the renewal of ties with Ivy opponents Brown and Yale, made 1945 a transition year. The university's record book omits the "informal" designation for 1945, but contemporary press accounts describe that year's program as "informal" and preparing for a return to the top tier of college football in 1946.

Harvard played its home games at Harvard Stadium in the Allston neighborhood of Boston, Massachusetts.

Schedule

References

Harvard
Harvard Crimson football seasons
Harvard Crimson football
1940s in Boston